L. digitata may refer to:
 Lambis digitata, a sea snail species
 Laminaria digitata, the oarweed, a large brown alga species found in the sublittoral zone of the northern Atlantic Ocean

See also